Midlothian and Peebles Northern by-election  may refer to:
1929 Midlothian and Peebles Northern by-election
1943 Midlothian and Peebles Northern by-election

See also 
 Midlothian and Peebles Northern (UK Parliament constituency)